Paradi or Paradhi is a village and Gram panchayat in Bobbili mandal of Vizianagaram district in Andhra Pradesh, India.

Paradhi Anicut in this village irrigates about 33.11 km² of land.

See also 
Bobbili mandal

References

Villages in Vizianagaram district